What If is the second studio album by the Dixie Dregs, released in 1978.

Track listing
 "Take It Off the Top" (Steve Morse) – 4:07
 "Odyssey" (Morse) – 7:35 
 "What If" (Morse) – 5:01
 "Travel Tunes" (Andy West) – 4:34
 "Ice Cakes" (Morse) – 4:39
 "Little Kids" (Morse) – 2:03
 "Gina Lola Breakdown" (Morse, Twiggs Lyndon) – 4:00
 "Night Meets Light" (Morse) – 7:47

Personnel 
 Steve Morse – guitar, banjo
 Mark Parrish – keyboards
 Allen Sloan – violin, viola
 Andy West – bass guitar
 Rod Morgenstein – drums, vocals

Production 
Producer  - Ken Scott
 Assistant engineers – Brian Leshon, Chris Gregg, Gary Coppola
 Mastered By – SR/2*
 Recorded At – Chateau Recorders
Production coordinator - Steven Brooks

Notes 
 "What If" and "Ice Cakes" are re-recordings from the band's 1976 demo record The Great Spectacular.
 The lead track "Take It Off the Top" was used as the theme song for the Friday Rock Show for most of the show's run (from 1978 to 1993).
 American heavy metal guitarist James Murphy covered "Odyssey" on his Feeding the Machine solo album.
 Progressive metal band Dream Theater covered "Odyssey" for the special edition of their 10th studio album Black Clouds & Silver Linings.

References

Dixie Dregs albums
1978 albums
Albums produced by Ken Scott
Capricorn Records albums